Edhem Pasha (1844–1909) was an Ottoman field marshal and leading figure in the propagation of the Ottoman military doctrine.

Life and career 

Edhem was born to a Turkısh family in Trabzon in present-day Turkey. He was the deputy of Gazi Osman Pasha during the siege of Plevna in 1877. He was the leading commander of the Ottoman army that defeated the Greek army on the Thessalian front during the Greco-Turkish War (1897), which would end in a decisive Turkish victory. Edhem Pasha was especially successful in the Battle of Domokos on the front. He captured Larissa and Trikala, but other European states intervened in favor of Greece because of the danger that Turks again could once again capture the rest of the Morea. As a result, the Greco-Turkish War resulted in a strategic stalemate despite the Turkish military victory on the field. Edhem Pasha died in Constantinople (modern-day Istanbul) in 1909.

References 

1844 births
1909 deaths
People from Trabzon
Ottoman military personnel of the Russo-Turkish War (1877–1878)
Ottoman military personnel of the Greco-Turkish War (1897)
Field marshals of the Ottoman Empire
Pashas